EyeMail Inc. is an American communications technology and digital marketing company based in Atlanta, Georgia. Founded by entrepreneur Lisa S. Jones, EyeMail Inc. is both a black and woman-owned business enterprise (WBE), and is an officially certified Minority Business Enterprise (MBE) by the NMSDC (National Minority Supplier Development Council).
  
The company is an "email video" provider, offering a technology that enables up to 60 seconds-long HD videos to be compressed and embedded directly into emails, avoiding the need to click on a link or access a browser to play them. Some of EyeMail Inc.'s chief clients include PepsiCo, Microsoft, Delta Air Lines, The Coca-Cola Company, Porsche North America, and Harvard Business School, although the company also partners with mid-tier and emerging brands, as well as nonprofit organizations.

History
EyeMail Inc. was founded by Lisa S. Jones in 2004 and is headquartered in Atlanta, Georgia. Jones is originally from Montgomery, Alabama, and enrolled at the Alabama A&M University, university from which she received BBA and MBA degrees. She also studied marketing management at the Tuck School of Business at Dartmouth. Before becoming an entrepreneur, Jones worked as a logistics and supply chain expert at NASA, eventually relocating to Atlanta to expand her career in supplier diversity for companies such as AT&T. Jones has revealed that she founded EyeMail Inc. after the unexpected passing away of her mother, making a "vow to start and scale a global company in her honor".

In 2004, Jones filed her first patent focused on video in email. For five years, she developed EyeMail Inc. during her spare time, as she was also working full-time as an executive in telecommunications in Atlanta. Initially, EyeMail Inc. was turned down by a number of American development agencies, so Jones worked with several international technical teams until choosing a final partnership, which developed the product in only six months. During her development process, Jones participated in Microsoft's Mentor/Protégé Innovation Lab Program, which "provided more support and expertise", as well as its Innovation Center, becoming the first African-American woman to do so.

In 2008, Jones presented EyeMail Inc. in the first season of the CBS reality competition show The Next Tycoon, which she won. Jones subsequently contacted Georgia's Greater Women's Business Council (GWBC) and offered to create a free EyeMail Inc. campaign for them. The campaign caught the attention of Time Warner executives, and the company became EyeMail Inc.'s first client. This prompted Jones to leave her day job and fully dedicate herself to the company. Following Time Warner, EyeMail Inc. began to work with other companies like The Coca-Cola Company, Delta Air Lines, Major League Baseball, Porsche North America, Aetna, the Atlanta Braves, and The Home Depot, among others. In 2008, EyeMail Inc. was listed at number 3 on the Atlanta Tribunes list for the "Top 8 Atlanta Businesses to Watch".

In 2008, EyeMail Inc. began a formal relationship with The Coca-Cola Company as part of their mentor program through the Georgia Minority Supplier Diversity Council (GMSDC). Three years later, the mentorship program with The Coca-Cola Company resulted in EyeMail Inc.'s selection by the Microsoft Corporation as a premier MWBE supplier in digital marketing. EyeMail's business partnership with The Coca-Cola Company was pivotal to the growth of the company, purportedly causing its revenue to quadruple. This allowed Jones' company to expand to Canada, Mexico, Pakistan, India and the United Kingdom.

As both a black-owned and woman-owned business, EyeMail Inc. is a partner of the Billion Dollar Roundtable organization, where it classified as a Minority Women Business Enterprise (MWBE) strategic partner. As EyeMail Inc.'s CEO, Jones took part as a panelist at the 2014 Billion Dollar Summit held by the Minority Business News USA (MBNUSA).

Writing for Forbes magazine in 2021, Laurel Donnellan noted that: "EyeMail's next-generation email experience has repeatedly proven with increases to click-through and call-to-action open rates while bringing email to life for a more engaging & memorable experience. Customers have achieved open rates of 60% and click-through rates of 38%, far above the industry average." In 2018, Jones announced that the company would expand its business model of custom-made campaigns, moving towards a software as a service (SaaS) platform. As of 2020, EyeMail Inc. partners with both private businesses—including The Coca-Cola Company and Delta Air Lines—as well as nonprofit organizations, such as the Make-A-Wish Foundation. Recently, EyeMail Inc. has launched a new product called EyeCon, which animates a logo or email signature, which, according to Forbess Lauren Donellan, "brings company logos to life".

The company's business model grew significantly due to the ongoing COVID-19 pandemic, as the need for employers to effectively communicate digitally became more relevant. In 2020, EyeMail Inc. announced the release of new options to support the hearing and visually impaired with close captioning, so they can also engage with the company's video email technology. This new venture was done in collaboration with Senior Architects at Microsoft's Innovation Lab. The company is also developing a "video in text solution" to expand product offerings, expected to be launched in 2022.

In 2020, EyeMail Inc.was chosen by PepsiCo as one of 15 participants in the Stacy's Pita Chips's Rise Project, a mentorship program to support black women business owners. As part of the project, EyeMail was added to a Female Founder Finder directory, which directs consumers to nearby female-founded businesses.

In 2021, Jones was listed as one of the "Top 10 Businesswomen to Admire in 2021" by global business magazine CIO Look, while EyeMail was listed as one of the "20 Innovative Companies Which Everyone Should Know in 2021" by the Atlanta-based Global Business Leaders Mag. In 2022, Jones was included in The Enterprise Worlds list for the "Enterprising Women of the Year", and The Atlantan Magazines special feature on the top innovators from Atlanta.

On May 23, 2022, EyeMail Inc. was a finalist for a Microsoft Supplier Prestige Award under the category of Diverse-Owned Supplier of the Year. Microsoft's press release described the nominated companies as "third‑party certified diverse-owned suppliers that strengthen our portfolio, amplify Microsoft's values and commitments, and exemplify the MSP Pillars of Strategy, Priority, Agility and Modernization." EyeMail has also

Awards and nominations

See also
 History of email
 List of Georgia (U.S. state) companies

References

External links
 
 Billion Dollar Roundtable (BDR)

American companies established in 2004
Black-owned companies of the United States
Email marketing software
Internet technology companies of the United States
Software companies based in Georgia (U.S. state)
Technology companies of the United States